Farsang may refer to:

parasang, an Iranian or Persian (which also includes Iraq) unit of measurement for how far a man can walk in a day "Stone to stone".
An Islamic folk character
:hu:Farsang, a Hungarian carnival that precedes the annual Busójárás celebration